Ali Berent Kavaklıoğlu (born May 4, 1986) is a Turkish professional basketball player, who lastly played for as a point guard for Afyon Belediye of the Turkish Basketball League.

External links
Berent Kavaklıoğlu FIBA Profile
Berent Kavaklıoğlu TBLStat.net Profile
Berent Kavaklıoğlu Eurobasket Profile
Berent Kavaklıoğlu TBL Profile

1986 births
Living people
Erdemirspor players
Hacettepe Üniversitesi B.K. players
İstanbul Büyükşehir Belediyespor basketball players
Kepez Belediyesi S.K. players
People from Ankara
TED Ankara Kolejliler players
Turkish men's basketball players
Uşak Sportif players
Point guards